Chogyal Wangchuk Tenzing Namgyal (Wylie: dbang-phyug bstan-'dzin rnam-rgyal; born 1 April 1953) is the second son of Palden Thondup Namgyal, the last sovereign king of Sikkim. Educated at Harrow, he is also the present heir of the Namgyal dynasty and pretender to the throne of Sikkim.

On February 19, 1982, following the death of his father, he was crowned at Tsuklakhang Palace. However, Government of India did not recognize this coronation. The 3rd Chief Minister of Sikkim, B. B. Gurung, recognized him as the 13th Chogyal.

Honours 
 :
  Chogyal Palden Thondup Namgyal Coronation Medal (4 April 1965).

Ancestry

References

External links
 Hidden Kingdom in the Himalayas

 

1953 births
Living people
People educated at Harrow School
Pretenders to the throne of Sikkim
Monarchs of Sikkim
Indian exiles